Franche is a village in Worcestershire, England, just outside Kidderminster.  It is served by two main bus services.  These are service 297 operated by Arriva Midlands and service 12 operated by Wyre Forest Dial-a-ride. Diamond Bus provide a few journeys to Franche as service 4/4A.

External links 
 
 

Villages in Worcestershire